Afghanistan is divided into:

 Provinces of Afghanistan
 Districts of Afghanistan
 Subdistricts of Afghanistan

 
Afghanistan